Fumarase deficiency (or fumaric aciduria) is an exceedingly rare autosomal recessive metabolic disorder in the Krebs cycle, characterized by a deficiency of the enzyme fumarate hydratase, which causes a buildup of fumaric acid in the urine and a deficiency of malate.  Only 13 cases were known worldwide in 1990, after which a cluster of 20 cases was documented in a community in Arizona that has practiced successive endogamy.

Presentation
Fumarase deficiency causes encephalopathy, severe intellectual disabilities, unusual facial features, brain malformation, and epileptic seizures due to an abnormally low amount of fumarase in cells. It can initially present with polyhydramnios on prenatal ultrasound. Affected neonates may demonstrate nonspecific signs of poor feeding and hypotonia. Laboratory findings in neonates may indicate polycythemia, leukopenia, or neutropenia. As they age, neurological deficits begin to manifest with seizures, dystonias, and severe developmental delay.

Pathophysiology
Fumarase deficiency is caused by a mutation in the fumarate hydratase (FH) gene in humans, which encodes the enzyme that converts fumarate to malate in the mitochondria.  Other mutant alleles of the FH gene, located on human Chromosome 1 at position 1q42.1, cause multiple cutaneous and uterine leiomyomata, hereditary leiomyomatosis and renal cell cancer. Fumarase deficiency is one of the few known deficiencies of the Krebs cycle or tricarboxylic acid cycle, the main enzymatic pathway of cellular aerobic respiration.

The condition is an autosomal recessive disorder, and it is therefore usually necessary for an affected individual to receive the mutant allele from both parents.   A number of children diagnosed with the disorder have been born to parents who were first cousins. It can also be associated with uniparental isodisomy.

Diagnosis

Treatment

Epidemiology
Fumarase deficiency is extremely rare – until around 1990 there had only been 13 diagnosed and identified cases worldwide.

A cluster of 20 cases has since been documented in the twin towns of Colorado City, Arizona and Hildale, Utah, both of which were formerly known as "Short Creek" (or the Short Creek Community). The two towns combine to form a community of 10,000 members of the Fundamentalist Church of Jesus Christ of Latter Day Saints who have a history of practicing successive endogamy, or marriage within their own communities.  Nicknamed "Polygamist's Down's", the syndrome has been blamed on cousin marriage, but in a larger sense is related to the reproductive isolation of a community among whom 85% are blood relatives of John Y. Barlow or Joseph Smith Jessop.

Since the initial cluster from FLDS communities were reported, it is now estimated that there are 100 documented cases worldwide.

See also
 Hereditary leiomyomatosis and renal cell cancer
 Founder effect

References

Further reading

External links 

Amino acid metabolism disorders
Autosomal recessive disorders
Rare diseases
TCA and ETC metabolism disorders
Fundamentalist Church of Jesus Christ of Latter-Day Saints
Disorders causing seizures